William "Billy" Friedkin (born August 29, 1935) is an American film and television director, producer and screenwriter closely identified with the "New Hollywood" movement of the 1970s. Beginning his career in documentaries in the early 1960s, he directed the crime thriller film The French Connection (1971), which won five Academy Awards, including Best Picture, Best Adapted Screenplay and Best Director, and the supernatural horror film The Exorcist (1973), which earned him a nomination for the Academy Award for Best Director.

His other films include the drama The Boys in the Band (1970), the thriller Sorcerer (1977), the crime comedy drama The Brink's Job (1978), the crime thriller Cruising (1980), the neo-noir thriller To Live and Die in L.A. (1985), the psychological horror film Bug (2006) and the black comedy Killer Joe (2011).

Early life
Friedkin was born in Chicago, Illinois, the son of Rachael (née Green) and Louis Friedkin. His father was a semi-professional softball player, merchant seaman, and men's clothing salesman. His mother, whom Friedkin called "a saint", was an operating room registered nurse. His parents were Jewish emigrants from Ukraine. His grandparents, parents, and other relatives fled Ukraine during a particularly violent anti-Jewish pogrom in 1903. Friedkin's father was somewhat uninterested in making money, and the family was generally lower middle class while he was growing up. According to film historian Peter Biskind, "Friedkin viewed his father with a mixture of affection and contempt for not making more of himself."  According to his memoir, The Friedkin Connection, Friedkin had the utmost affection for his father.

Friedkin attended public schools in Chicago. He enrolled at Senn High School, where he played basketball well enough to consider turning professional. However he was not a serious student and barely received grades good enough to graduate, which he did at the age of 16. According to Friedkin, this was because of social promotion and not because he was bright.

Friedkin began going to movies as a teenager, and has cited Citizen Kane as one of his key influences. Several sources claim that Friedkin saw this motion picture as a teenager, but Friedkin himself says that he did not see the film until 1960, when he was 25 years old. Only then, Friedkin says, did he become a true cineaste. Among the movies which he saw as a teenager and young adult were Les Diaboliques, The Wages of Fear (which many consider he remade as Sorcerer), and Psycho (which he viewed repeatedly, like Citizen Kane). Televised documentaries such as 1960's Harvest of Shame  were also important in his developing sense of cinema.

He began working in the mail room at WGN-TV immediately after high school. Within two years (at the age of 18), he started his directorial career doing live television shows and documentaries. His efforts included The People vs. Paul Crump (1962), which won an award at the San Francisco International Film Festival and contributed to the commutation of Crump's death sentence. Its success helped Friedkin get a job with producer David L. Wolper. He also made the football-themed documentary Mayhem on a Sunday Afternoon.

Career
As mentioned in his voice-over commentary on the DVD re-release of Alfred Hitchcock's Vertigo, Friedkin directed one of the last episodes of The Alfred Hitchcock Hour in 1965, called "Off Season". Hitchcock admonished Friedkin for not wearing a tie while directing.

In 1965, Friedkin moved to Hollywood and two years later released his first feature film, Good Times starring Sonny and Cher. He has referred to the film as "unwatchable". Several other "art" films followed: The Birthday Party, based on an unpublished screenplay by Harold Pinter, which he adapted from his own play; the musical comedy The Night They Raided Minsky's; and the adaptation of Mart Crowley's play The Boys in the Band.

His next film, The French Connection, was released to wide critical acclaim in 1971. Shot in a gritty style more suited for documentaries than Hollywood features, the film won five Academy Awards, including Best Picture and Best Director.

Friedkin's next film was 1973's The Exorcist, based on William Peter Blatty's best-selling novel, which revolutionized the horror genre and is considered by some critics to be one of the greatest horror movies of all time. The Exorcist was nominated for 10 Academy Awards, including Best Picture and Best Director. It won for Best Screenplay and Best Sound.

Following these two pictures, Friedkin, along with Francis Ford Coppola and Peter Bogdanovich, was deemed one of the premier directors of New Hollywood. In 1973, the trio announced the formation of an independent production company at Paramount, The Directors Company. Whereas Coppola directed The Conversation and Bogdanovich, the Henry James adaptation, Daisy Miller, Friedkin abruptly left the company, which was soon closed by Paramount. But Friedkin's later movies did not achieve the same success. Sorcerer (1977), a $22 million American remake of the French classic The Wages of Fear, co-produced by both Universal and Paramount, starring Roy Scheider, was overshadowed by the blockbuster box-office success of Star Wars, which had been released exactly one week prior. Friedkin considers it his finest film, and was personally devastated by its financial and critical failure (as mentioned by Friedkin himself in the 1999 documentary series The Directors).

Sorcerer was shortly followed by the crime-comedy The Brink's Job (1978), based on the real-life Great Brink's Robbery in Boston, Massachusetts, which was also unsuccessful at the box-office. In 1980, he directed an adaptation of the Gerald Walker crime thriller Cruising, starring Al Pacino, which was protested against even during its making and remains the subject of heated debate. The film was critically assailed, and was a financial disappointment.

Friedkin suffered a major heart attack on March 6, 1981, due to a genetically caused defect in his circumflex left coronary artery, and nearly died. He spent months in rehabilitation.

Throughout the 1980s and 1990s, Friedkin's films received mostly lackluster reviews and moderate ticket sales. Deal of the Century (1983), starring Chevy Chase, Gregory Hines and Sigourney Weaver, was sometimes regarded as a latter-day Dr. Strangelove, though it was generally savaged by critics. However, his action/crime movie To Live and Die in L.A. (1985), starring William Petersen and Willem Dafoe, was a critical favorite and drew comparisons to Friedkin's own The French Connection (particularly for its car-chase sequence), while his courtroom-drama/thriller Rampage (1987) received a fairly positive review from Roger Ebert despite major distribution problems. He next directed the horror film The Guardian (1990) and then the thriller Jade (1995), starring Linda Fiorentino. Though the latter film received an unfavorable response from critics and audiences, Friedkin said that Jade was the favorite of all the films he had made, as is Sorcerer.

In 2000, The Exorcist was re-released in theaters with extra footage and grossed $40 million in the U.S. alone. Friedkin directed the 2007 film Bug due to a positive experience watching the stage version in 2004. He was surprised to find that he was, metaphorically, on the same page as the playwright and felt that he could relate well to the story. The film won the FIPRESCI prize at the Cannes Film Festival.

Later, Friedkin directed an episode of the TV series CSI: Crime Scene Investigation titled "Cockroaches", which re-teamed him with To Live and Die in L.A. star William Petersen. He directed again for CSIs 200th episode, "Mascara".

In 2011, Friedkin directed Killer Joe, a black comedy written by Tracy Letts based on Letts' play, and starring Matthew McConaughey, Emile Hirsch, Juno Temple, Gina Gershon, and Thomas Haden Church. Killer Joe premiered at the 68th Venice International Film Festival, prior to its North American debut at the 2011 Toronto International Film Festival. It opened in U.S. theaters in July 2012, to some favorable reviews from critics but did poorly at the box office, possibly because of its restrictive NC-17 rating.

In April 2013, Friedkin published a memoir, The Friedkin Connection. He was presented with a lifetime achievement award at the 70th Venice International Film Festival in September.

In 2017, Friedkin directed The Devil and Father Amorth, a documentary showing the ninth exorcism of an Italian woman in the village of Venafro.

In August 2022, it was announced that Friedkin would be returning to directing to helm an adaptation of the two-act play The Caine Mutiny Court-Martial starring Kiefer Sutherland as Lt. Commander Queeg.

Archive
The moving image collection of William Friedkin is held at the Academy Film Archive. The material at the Academy Film Archive is complemented by material in the William Friedkin papers at the academy's Margaret Herrick Library.

Influences
Fredkin has cited Jean-Luc Godard, Federico Fellini, François Truffaut, and Akira Kurosawa.

In regards to influences to specific films on his films, Friedkin notes that the film's documentary-like realism was the direct result of the influence of having seen Z, a French film by Costa-Gavras. Friedkin mentioned the film's influence on him when directing The French Connection:

Personal life

William Friedkin has been married four times:

Jeanne Moreau, married February 8, 1977 and divorced in 1979.
Lesley-Anne Down, married in 1982 and divorced in 1985.
Kelly Lange, married on June 7, 1987, and divorced in 1990.
Sherry Lansing, married on July 6, 1991.

While he was filming The Boys in the Band in 1970, Friedkin began a relationship with Kitty Hawks, daughter of director Howard Hawks. It lasted two years, during which the couple announced their engagement, but the relationship ended about 1972. Friedkin began a four-year relationship with Australian dancer and choreographer Jennifer Nairn-Smith in 1972. Although they announced an engagement twice, they never married. They did, however, have a son, Cedric, born on November 27, 1976. Friedkin and his second wife, Lesley-Anne Down, also had a son, Jack, born in 1982. Friedkin was raised Jewish, but called himself an agnostic later in life. However, during an appearance and Q&A at a 40th anniversary screening of The Exorcist at the 2013 Dallas International Film Festival, Friedkin said he "believes strongly in God" and "the teachings of Jesus" and other religious figures, and that mankind is "in God's hands."

Filmography

Film 

Documentary films

Television 
TV series

TV movies

Awards

Friedkin was made Honorary Associate of London Film School.

Bibliography 

 Friedkin, William. The Friedkin Connection: A Memoir. New York: HarperCollins, 2013. 
 Friedkin, William. Conversations at the American Film Institute With the Great Moviemakers: The Next Generation. George Stevens, Jr., ed. New York: Alfred A. Knopf, 2012.

References

Further reading
Biskind, Peter. Easy Riders, Raging Bulls: How the Sex-Drugs-And Rock 'N Roll Generation Saved Hollywood. New York: Simon and Schuster, 1998. 
Claggett, Thomas D. William Friedkin: Films of Aberration, Obsession, and Reality. Los Angeles: Silman-James Press, 2003. 
Derry, Charles, ed. Dark Dreams 2.0: A Psychological History of the Modern Horror Film From the 1950s to the 21st Century. Jefferson, N.C.: McFarland & Co., 2009. 
Edmonds, I. G. and Mimura, Reiko. The Oscar Directors. San Diego: A.S. Barnes, 1980. 
Emery, Robert J., ed. The Directors: In Their Own Words. Vol. 2. New York: TV Books, 1999. 
Hamm, Theodore. Rebel and a Cause: Caryl Chessman and the Politics of the Death Penalty in Postwar California, 1948–1974. Berkeley, Calif.: University of California Press, 2001. 
Segaloff, Nat. Hurricane Billy: The Stormy Life and Films of William Friedkin. New York: Morrow, 1990. 
Stevens, Jr., George, ed. Conversations at the American Film Institute With the Great Moviemakers: The Next Generation. New York: Alfred A. Knopf, 2012. 
Wakeman, John. World Film Directors, 1945–1985. New York: Wilson, 1988. 
Walker, Elsie M. and Johnson, David T., eds. Conversations With Directors: An Anthology of Interviews From 'Literature/Film Quarterly'. Lanham, Md.: Scarecrow Press, 2008.

External links 

 
 
 
 "From 'Popeye' Doyle to Puccini: William Friedkin" NPR's Robert Siegel interviews Friedkin, September 14, 2006
 EXCL: Bug Director William Friedkin 
 The Reeler interview with Friedkin
 William Friedkin papers, Margaret Herrick Library, Academy of Motion Picture Arts and Sciences

1935 births
American agnostics
American television directors
Best Directing Academy Award winners
Best Director Golden Globe winners
Officiers of the Ordre des Arts et des Lettres
Jewish agnostics
Jewish American screenwriters
Living people
Writers from Chicago
American male screenwriters
American film producers
Directors Guild of America Award winners
Film directors from Illinois
American people of Ukrainian-Jewish descent
Action film directors
Screenwriters from Illinois
20th-century American screenwriters
20th-century American male writers
21st-century American screenwriters
21st-century American male writers